Michael U. Gisriel (born March 15, 1951) was a member of the Maryland House of Delegates.

Background
Gisriel served a single term in the Maryland House of Delegates before losing in his reelection bid in 1990 to Martha Klima, John Bishop and Gerry Brewster.

Education
Gisriel graduated from Loyola Blakefield High School in Towson, Maryland, then attended the University of Pennsylvania in Philadelphia where he graduated with his Bachelor's degree in 1973.  He continued at the University of Maryland School of Law where he received his J.D. in 1976.  He was admitted to the Maryland Bar in the same year.

Career
After college Gisriel formed a general civil practice law firm, Gisriel and Gisriel, and served as one of the partners.  He later served as counsel to the Majority Leader of the  Slate Senate in 1979. From 1980 until 1982 he was a special assistant to the Baltimore County Executive for state legislative affairs. Gisriel was also a member of the Governor's Housing Task Force from 1981 until 1984 and a member of the Democratic State Central Committee from 1982 until 1986.  Additionally, he was a member of the Board of Advertising Club of Baltimore and the 9-4-2 Democratic Club. Gisriel received two Resolutions of Achievement from General Assembly.

Career after politics
Gisriel served for a while as a real estate columnist for the Baltimore Sun.  From 1993-1999, Gisriel was the host of "All About Real Estate" on WCBM Radio.  He continued to practice law with emphasis on government relations (legislative and regulatory), real estate, condominium zoning and real estate financing law.  He continues to serve as a lobbyist in Annapolis.

In 2004, an investigation of Gisriel began when, according to the Baltimore Sun, "…Gisriel was mistakenly sent a settlement check intended for his former clients. Gisriel argued that his behavior was unintentional, while the court said his action was dishonest."  Gisriel failed to investigate the origins of the check and in 2009 was disbarred as a result of the incident after a ruling from the Maryland Court of Appeals.

Election results
1990 Race for Maryland House of Delegates – District 9
Voters to choose three:
{| class="wikitable"
!Name
!Votes
!Percent
!Outcome
|-
|-
|Martha S. Klima, Rep.
|15,461
|  19%
|   Won
|-
|-
|Gerry L. Brewster, Dem.
|14,876
|  19%
|   Won
|-
|-
|John J. Bishop, Rep.
|14,589
|  18%
|   Won
|-
|-
|Michael Gisriel, Dem.
|14,428
|  18%
|   Lost
|-
|-
|Charles Culbertson, Dem.
|10,522
|  13%
|   Lost
|-
|-
|James Holechek, Rep.
|9,855
|  12%
|   Lost
|}

1986 Race for Maryland House of Delegates – District 9
Voters to choose three:
{| class="wikitable"
!Name
!Votes
!Percent
!Outcome
|-
|-
|Martha S. Klima, Rep.
|16,082
|  19%
|   Won
|-
|-
|Michael Gisriel, Dem.
|14,329
|  17%
|   Won
|-
|-
|John J. Bishop, Rep.
|14,004
|  17%
|   Won
|-
|-
|Patrick E. Carter, Rep.
|13,003
|  16%
|   Lost
|-
|-
|Jack R. Sturgill Jr., Dem.
|12,819
|  16%
|   Lost
|-
|-
|William R. Richardson Jr., Dem.
|12,291
|  15%
|   Lost
|}

References

External links
 Maryland Manual, 1989-90: Volume 184, Page 108

1951 births
Living people
Members of the Maryland House of Delegates
Politicians from Baltimore
University of Pennsylvania alumni
University of Maryland Francis King Carey School of Law alumni